The Prince of Teck is a Grade II listed public house at 161 Earls Court Road, Earls Court, London.

It was constructed in 1868 for the Child family, by the builders Huggett and Hussey (Thomas Huggett and Thomas Hussey).  It was altered from 1879 to 1881, and the balustrading, stone wyverns and busts are by George Edwards, the "favourite architect" of the publican and developer Alfred Savigear.

References

External links
 
 

Pubs in the Royal Borough of Kensington and Chelsea
Grade II listed pubs in London
Earls Court
Buildings and structures completed in 1868
19th-century architecture in the United Kingdom